

People 

Scattergood is a surname. Notable people with the surname include:

 Ernald Scattergood, English footballer
 Henry Scattergood, American cricketer
 Ken Scattergood, English footballer
 Polly Scattergood, British singer-songwriter

See also 
 Scattergood Friends School, in Cedar County, Iowa